Andrés Martínez (born 10 June 1944) is a Cuban weightlifter. He competed at the 1968 Summer Olympics and the 1972 Summer Olympics.

References

1944 births
Living people
Cuban male weightlifters
Olympic weightlifters of Cuba
Weightlifters at the 1968 Summer Olympics
Weightlifters at the 1972 Summer Olympics
People from Pinar del Río
Pan American Games medalists in weightlifting
Pan American Games bronze medalists for Cuba
Weightlifters at the 1967 Pan American Games
20th-century Cuban people